Muddle Earth is a science fiction novel by British writer John Brunner. It was first published in the United States by Ballantine Del Rey Books in 1993. It tells the story of a man awakened from cryogenic suspension in a bizarre 24th century where Earth is a tourist attraction.

References

1993 British novels
1993 science fiction novels
American science fiction novels
Novels by John Brunner
Del Rey books